The Levant water frog (Pelophylax bedriagae), formerly belonging to the genus Rana, is a southern European species of frog. They are green to brown in color with dark blotches on their dorsal side. They are cousins of the aquatic frogs and live most of the time in the water. They are not poisonous and are quite large, especially the females. It has been introduced in some countries where it was not native, one of which is Malta. First kept as a pet, then recently during the 1990s, it was deliberately introduced to a number of fresh water rock pools in Gozo, where in one it sustains a large population. Though a prolific and invasive species, it is restricted to constant fresh water supply, so it cannot spread naturally on its own on arid Mediterranean islands.

Etymology
This species is named for herpetologist Jacques von Bedriaga.

References
SCIBERRAS, A.  & SCHEMBRI,P.J. (2006) Rana bedriagae. Herpetological review 37(1):102.

SCIBERRAS, A.  & SCHEMBRI,P.J.  (2006) Occurrence of Alien Bedriaga's frog (Rana bedriagae) Camerano, 1882 in the Maltese Islands, and implications for conservation. Herpetological Bulletin-Number 95:.2-5.

  Database entry includes a range map and justification for why this species is of least concern

Pelophylax
Amphibians of Europe
Amphibians described in 1882